Sven Sökler (born 9 November 1984) is a German former professional footballer who played as an attacking midfielder.

Career
Released by VfB Stuttgart as a youngster, Sökler began his career in amateur football with TuS Ergenzingen before joining Stuttgart's second professional club, Stuttgarter Kickers in 2005. He started off in the reserve team, and made his first-team debut in October 2005, as a substitute for Nico Kanitz in a 2–2 draw with SpVgg Bayreuth. He spent three seasons with Kickers, but never fully established himself as a first-team player, before leaving for SSV Reutlingen in 2008. Six months later he moved again, joining Darmstadt 98, where he had a successful two and a half years, culminating in the club winning promotion to the 3. Liga in 2011. Following this, Sökler left Darmstadt for fellow 3. Liga side, 1. FC Saarbrücken, where he was joined by his younger brother, Marcel, a year later.

In July 2013, he signed for 1. FC Heidenheim and won the 3. Liga championship in his first season. This resulted in Heidenheim being promoted to 2. Bundesliga, Sökler however left the club shortly after the start of the new season without having earned a cap. He returned to 1. FC Saarbrücken.

References

External links

1984 births
Living people
Stuttgarter Kickers players
SSV Reutlingen 05 players
SV Darmstadt 98 players
1. FC Saarbrücken players
1. FC Heidenheim players
FC 08 Homburg players
3. Liga players
Regionalliga players
Association football midfielders
German footballers